Rear Admiral  was a senior officer in the Imperial Japanese Navy during World War II. He was an observer during the First Battle of Savo Island.

Commands & Positions
Gunnery Officer, Isuzu - 1 December 1925 - 1 December 1926
Gunnery Officer, Haruna - 10 October 1929 - 1 December 1930
2nd Fleet Staff Officer - 1 December 1930 - 1 December 1931
Commanding Officer, Kitakami - 10 October 1935 - 1 December 1937
Commanding Officer, Nagara - 1 December 1936 - 20 February 1937 (additional duty while Commanding Officer of Kitakami)
Commanding Officer, Kinugasa - 1 December 1937 - 3 June 1938
Commanding Officer, Takao - 3 June 1938 - 15 November 1939
Commanding Officer, Asahi - 15 November 1939 - 15 November 1940
Commanding Officer, Maizuru Sailor Corps - 15 November 1940 - 11 August 1941
Commanding Officer, Kure Sailor Corps - 11 August 1941 - 11 June 1942
Commanding Officer, Kure Naval Guard Corps - 20 November 1941 - 11 June 1942 (additional duty while assigned to Kure)
ComCruDiv 18–11 June 1942 - 24 December 1942
Director, Tateyama Gunnery School - 6 January 1943 - 27 December 1943
Navy General Headquarters, Tokyo 1943-1944
Commander, 7th Escort Group - 8 April 1944 - 23 December 1944
Member, Grand Escort Fleet, Tokyo 1944-1945
Commander, 105th Escort Squadron - 5 May 1945 - 15 September 1945

Promotions
Midshipman - 17 July 1912
Ensign - 1 December 1913
Lieutenant (j.g.) - 13 December 1915
Lieutenant - 1 December 1918
Lieutenant Commander - 1 December 1924
Commander - 1 December 1930
Captain - 15 November 1934
Rear Admiral - 15 November 1940

References

1891 births
1959 deaths
Imperial Japanese Navy admirals
Japanese military personnel of World War II